Louis John Molepske, Jr., (born January 6, 1974) is an American attorney, judge, and Democratic politician.  He is a Wisconsin circuit court judge in Portage County, Wisconsin, since 2022.  He previously served nine years as district attorney, and was a member of the Wisconsin State Assembly for ten years before that.

Early life and education
Louis Molepske was born and raised in Stevens Point, Wisconsin.  He graduated from Stevens Point Area Senior High School in 1993 and went on to earn his bachelor's degree in political science from the University of Wisconsin–Madison. He then attended Marquette University Law School, where he earned his J.D. in 2001.  While in high school, he wrote for a student section included in the Stevens Point daily newspaper, the Stevens Point Journal.

Political career
After completing law school, he went to work in the city government of Stevens Point.  He first worked as an assistant to his father, the city attorney, and then as an assistant to the mayor, Gary Wescott, and finally as a special prosecutor in the office of the district attorney, Tom Eagon.  

In 2002, incumbent state senator Kevin Shibilski was indicted for fraud, which led to his resignation and the election of state representative Julie Lassa as his replacement.  Lassa's elevation created a vacancy in Wisconsin's 71st Assembly district, and Molepske chose to enter the race for the open seat.  He narrowly prevailed in the low-turnout special election, receiving 37% of the vote in a four-way race.  At the time he was sworn in, Molepske was the second youngest state legislator at 29 years old.  He went on to win re-election four times.

In the April 2012 election, Molepske's former boss, district attorney Tom Eagon, was elected a Wisconsin circuit court judge.  Molepske soon announced that, rather than running for another term in the Assembly, he would instead run for district attorney.  He faced only one opponent in the race, the senior assistant district attorney, Veronica Isherwood, in the Democratic primary.  Molepske won 65% of the vote in the primary and was unopposed in the general election.  He was re-elected without opposition in 2016 and 2020.

In the Fall of 2021, incumbent Wisconsin circuit court judge Robert J. Shannon filed his paperwork to indicate he would not run for re-election in 2022.  Molepske entered the race for the judicial post; he defeated attorney Stephen W. Sawyer in the Spring general election and was sworn in in August 2022.

Personal life and family

Louis Molepske is a fifth-generation resident of Portage County, Wisconsin.  His father is also an attorney and was in public office as city attorney of Stevens Point; his grandfather was a prominent realtor.

Louis Molepske married Raquel Vechinski, a nurse practitioner from Wisconsin Rapids, in October 2013.  They have three children now and reside in Stevens Point.

Electoral history

Wisconsin Assembly (2003–2010)

| colspan="6" style="text-align:center;background-color: #e9e9e9;"| Special Election, July 22, 2003

Portage County District Attorney (2012, 2016, 2020)

| colspan="6" style="text-align:center;background-color: #e9e9e9;"| Democratic Primary, August 14, 2012

 
 
| colspan="6" style="text-align:center;background-color: #e9e9e9;"| General Election, November 6, 2012

Wisconsin Circuit Court Judge (2022)

| colspan="6" style="text-align:center;background-color: #e9e9e9;"| General Election, April 5, 2022

References

External links
 Official (Assembly) website (Archived February 20, 2012)
 Louis Molepske for State Assembly official campaign website
 Molepske for Judge 2022 campaign website
 
 
 Follow the Money - Louis Molepske
2008 2006 2004 campaign contributions
Campaign 2008 campaign contributions at Wisconsin Democracy Campaign

1974 births
Living people
Marquette University Law School alumni
University of Wisconsin–Madison College of Letters and Science alumni
People from Stevens Point, Wisconsin
21st-century American politicians
District attorneys in Wisconsin
Wisconsin state court judges
Democratic Party members of the Wisconsin State Assembly